The Indian blood group system (In) is a classification of blood based on the presence or absence of inherited antigens that reside within the CD44 molecule that is expressed on the surface of blood cells. It is named so because 4% of the population in India possess it. Most individuals express the Inb antigen that results from an arginine residue at position 46 of CD44 .  The Ina blood type results from a substitution proline for arginine at this same position.

References 

Blood antigen systems
Transfusion medicine